Alex "Sanny" McAnespie is a Scottish former professional football player and manager.

Career
McAnespie, a central defender,  played for Craigmark Burntonians, Ayr United and Cumnock Juniors.

After retiring from playing, McAnespie was manager of Stranraer between 1987 and 1996.

His son, Stephen McAnespie, played for Raith Rovers, Bolton Wanderers and Fulham.

References

Year of birth missing (living people)
Living people
Scottish footballers
Craigmark Burntonians F.C. players
Ayr United F.C. players
Cumnock Juniors F.C. players
Scottish Football League players
Association football defenders
Scottish football managers
Stranraer F.C. managers
Scottish Football League managers
Scottish Junior Football Association players